Walker Field Shelterhouse is a historic park shelter located at South Bend, St. Joseph County, Indiana.  It was constructed in 1938 by the Works Progress Administration. It is a one-story, "T"-shaped fieldstone building.  It consists of a gable roofed section with attached hipped roof arcades enclosing space for a wading pool.  The central section features three wide segmental arched openings.

It was listed on the National Register of Historic Places in 2006.

References

Works Progress Administration in Indiana
Park buildings and structures on the National Register of Historic Places in Indiana
Buildings and structures completed in 1938
Buildings and structures in South Bend, Indiana
National Register of Historic Places in St. Joseph County, Indiana